Saranist (also, Saramist and Tutiya) is a former village in the Kotayk Province of Armenia.

See also 
Kotayk Province

References 

Populated places in Kotayk Province
Former populated places in the Caucasus